Landlord Credit Bureau (LCB) is the rental industry’s partner that provides tools to improve the businesses and lives of landlords, property managers and responsible tenants.

Overview 
LCB was founded in 2012 as an online network for landlords and property managers and operates a Reporting Agency in the US and Canada. The LCB platform is focused on empowering landlords with the tools necessary to motivate and reward tenant behavior. LCB helps renters who have a record of paying their rent on time but have unsubstantial credit scores to obtain housing. Through the LCB tenants can build and share their payment history with potential landlords.

LCB shares information with Equifax to be included on renters credit reports. Landlords can report their tenants’ payments (or non-payments) to the LCB, and tenants are also able to build a positive Rental Record which will go to Equifax and end up on their credit report.

As reported in Financial Post, "this initiative could particularly help younger Canadians qualify for mortgages, director of consumer advocacy at Equifax Julie Kuzmic said, it could especially help immigrants, who often struggle to build credit in Canada because their records from back home aren’t recognized here.

References 

Companies established in 2012
Canadian companies established in 2012